Polk County School District may refer to 
 Polk County School District, Florida
 Polk County School District, Georgia